The Leeds municipal elections were held on Thursday 12 May 1949, with one third of the seats to be elected.

Witnessing a slight swing away from them of 0.5%, the Conservatives won a narrow majority of the seats contested. With the seats last fought in Labour's landslide of 1945, all but four of the Conservative seats were gains. Totalling ten, the Conservatives safely gained Blenheim, Cross Gates & Temple Newsam and Upper Armley; less so in Beeston and Bramley, and very closely in Harehills, Kirkstall, Mill Hill & South and Farnley & Wortley (the latter being won by nine votes). The Conservatives also gained an extra alderman off the back of the gains, reducing Labour's hold to a slender majority of eight. Turnout returned to 46.4% after the spike recorded the previous election.

Election result

The result had the following consequences for the total number of seats on the council after the elections:

Ward results

References

Leeds City Council election
1949
Leeds City Council election
City Council election, 1949